Callahan is an unincorporated community in Siskiyou County, California, United States. Callahan has a post office with ZIP code 96014. As of 2009 it has a population of 50~.

History
The post office opened as Callahan's Ranch in 1858 and changed its name to Callahan in 1892. The community was named after M.B. Callahan, who opened a travelers' stop in the community in 1851.

Climate
This region experiences warm (but not hot) and dry summers, with no average monthly temperatures above 71.6 °F.  According to the Köppen Climate Classification system, Callahan has a warm-summer Mediterranean climate, abbreviated "Csb" on climate maps.

References

Unincorporated communities in California
Unincorporated communities in Siskiyou County, California